Alloxylon wickhamii is a rainforest tree to  tall in the family Proteaceae. It is endemic to the Wet Tropics of Queensland.

In the wet tropics it is found growing in various well developed rain forests and apparently is "probably more abundant in upland and mountain rain forests".

It is "not as well known as Alloxylon flammeum but deserves an equal place in horticulture".

References

wickhamii
Proteales of Australia
Trees of Australia
Plants described in 1874
Taxa named by Ferdinand von Mueller